Lion Air Flight 538 (JT 538) was a scheduled domestic passenger flight from Soekarno–Hatta International Airport, Jakarta, to Juanda International Airport in Surabaya, with a stopover at Adi Sumarmo Airport, Surakarta, Indonesia. On 30 November 2004, the McDonnell Douglas MD-82 overran the runway of Adi Sumarmo Airport, and crashed onto a cemetery on landing; 25 people on board were killed in the crash, including the captain.
Investigation conducted by the Indonesian National Transportation Safety Committee concluded that the crash was caused by hydroplaning, which was aggravated by wind shear.

Aircraft
The aircraft, a McDonnell Douglas MD-82, with line number 1173 and manufacturer's serial number 49189, made its first flight on 13 November 1984, later delivered on 20 December 1984 and operated by Mexican carrier Aeroméxico as XA-AMP, and named Aguascalientes before being acquired by Lion Air in 2002 and registered as PK-LMN. Lion Air had sold the aircraft to another airline for delivery in January 2005.

Accident
Flight 538 took off from Jakarta at around 5:00 pm, carrying a total of 146 passengers and seven crew members. Most of the passengers were members of the Nahdlatul Ulama, who were attending a national meeting held after the victorious result of the 2004 Indonesian Presidential Election. The flight was uneventful until its landing.

The flight arrived at the airport during dusk, around 6:00 pm in heavy rain. A thunderstorm was reportedly present during the landing.

Flight 538 was configured appropriately for landing, touched down "smoothly" according to most passengers, and the thrust reversers were deployed. The aircraft, however, failed to slow adequately, overran the runway, and slammed into an embankment. The impact caused the floor of the front portion of the plane to collapse, reportedly killing many of the passengers. The aircraft split into two sections, coming to rest in the end of the runway, and fuel began to leak. Passengers had difficulty locating emergency exits in the waning light. Some of the passengers self-evacuated through the opening in the fuselage.

Immediate aftermath
The airport was closed and emergency services were notified. Injured passengers were transported by police vehicles and ambulances to numerous hospitals across Solo. At least 14 of the dead were transported to the Pabelan Hospital. Six people, two dead and four injured, were transported to Panti Waluyo Hospital. Others were transported to Oen Kandangsapi, Brayat Minulya, Kasih Ibu, Oen Solo Baru, and PKU Muhammadiyah, as well as facilities in Boyolali and Karanganyar. Survivors with minor injuries were treated inside the airport VIP terminal.

Twenty-five people were killed and 59 others were seriously injured.

Passengers and crew
Most of the passengers were Indonesians, while airport officials confirmed that one Singaporean man was among the injured. The pilots at the control of the flight were Captain Dwi Mawastoro and First Officer Stephen Lesdek. Captain Dwi died in the crash, while First Officer Lesdek survived with serious injuries.

Investigation
The newly elected Indonesian President Susilo Bambang Yudhoyono ordered an immediate investigation onto the cause of the crash of Flight 538 and stated that the investigation should be open to the public to prevent unwanted rumors in the aftermath of the crash. Minister of Transportation Hatta Rajasa stated that the Transportation Department would evaluate the Indonesian airline operations in response to the crash of Flight 538 in addition to two other similar incidents that occurred on the same day.

The black box was subsequently found on December 1, 2004, and was transported to the Adi Sumarmo Emergency Operations Center.

A witness to the crash claimed that lightning struck the plane during its landing phase. According to him, the landing light and the interior lighting were extinguished after the strike.

Lion Air "claimed responsibility" for the crash and stated that they would pay the hospital bills of the survivors. However, they denied that the crash was caused by the airline's misconduct, and stated that weather was the main factor. According to them, Flight 538 experienced a tailwind during its landing, which explained why the plane did not stop. Others claimed that the brakes or the thrust reversers malfunctioned. The pilot did not put the throttle into flight idle, which caused the spoiler to retract, one of the reverse thrusts also was found to be faulty.

The preliminary report was published in 2005. Investigators stated that the plane's braking system was not at its optimum level. This condition was aggravated by weather conditions during the accident. Investigators also identified a faulty thrust reverser as one of the causes of the crash; they subsequently issued several recommendations to Lion Air.

Lion Air continues to use the flight number 538, but only on Jakarta-Solo route, primarily operated by a Boeing 737-800 or Boeing 737-900ER.

See also
 List of accidents and incidents involving commercial aircraft

References

External links

Information (Archive)– National Transportation Safety Board

2004 disasters in Indonesia
538
Accidents and incidents involving the McDonnell Douglas MD-82
Airliner accidents and incidents caused by weather
Airliner accidents and incidents caused by pilot error
Aviation accidents and incidents in Indonesia
Aviation accidents and incidents in 2004
2004 in Indonesia
Airliner accidents and incidents involving runway overruns
November 2004 events in Asia